The United States Department of Defense acknowledges holding three Palestinian detainees in Guantanamo.
A total of 778 detainees have been held in extrajudicial detention in the Guantanamo Bay detention camps, in Cuba since the camps opened on January 11, 2002
The camp population peaked in 2004 at approximately 660.  Only twenty new detainees, all "high value detainees" have been transferred there since the United States Supreme Court's ruling in Rasul v. Bush.

Cageprisoners states a fourth individual, named Hussein Azzam, is a former detainee at Guantanamo.

On September 16, 2009 Hungary agreed to accept the transfer of a Guantanamo detainee from Palestine.

On February 24, 2010, Spain accepted the transfer of an individual Guantanamo detainee from Palestine.
The former detainee will be free to live and work in Spain, and to travel freely within Spain, but he will not be allowed to travel from Spain to other countries.
To preserve the detainee's privacy Spanish authorities did not make his name public.
According to Press reports relatives have confirmed that Walid Hijazi, a man from the Gaza strip, is the newly released Palestinian.

References

Palestinian